In military terms, 78th Division or 78th Infantry Division may refer to:

 Infantry divisions 
 78th Division (People's Republic of China), a unit of the Chinese Army 1952–1954; later the Inner Changshan Garrison Division
 78th Division (2nd Formation)(People's Republic of China), 1969–1985
 78th Reserve Division (German Empire), a unit of the Imperial German Army  
 78th Infantry Division (Germany), a unit of the German Army 
 78th Rifle Division (Soviet Union), a unit of the Soviet Army 
 78th Infantry Division (United Kingdom), a unit of the United Kingdom Army  
 78th Division (United States), a unit of the United States Army 
 Armoured divisions 
 78th Tank Division (Soviet Union)

See also
 78th Regiment (disambiguation)
 78 Squadron (disambiguation)